Rita May (born 9 May 1942) is an English actress. She is known for her roles as Mags in the ITV children's drama Children's Ward, Margaret in the Sky One sitcom Trollied, as well as Julie "Nana" Booth in the Channel 4 drama Ackley Bridge.

Career 
May began her career as a singer on the working men's club circuit in and around South Yorkshire. She featured in the television adaptation of Barry Hines's The Price of Coal, a Play for Today first broadcast in 1977, and as Jimmy Kemp's mother in Hines's scripted nuclear war drama Threads in 1984.

She has also appeared in television series such as Early Doors and Drop Dead Gorgeous, and radio programmes including Ed Reardon's Week and The Blackburn Files. In 2005, she appeared in one episode of Heartbeat. In March 2009, it was announced that May would appear as Connie Rathbone, a new love interest of Jack Duckworth, in the ITV soap opera Coronation Street.

From 2011 to 2018, she appeared in the Sky One sitcom Trollied, in which she played Margaret, a supermarket assistant pharmacist. In 2017, May appeared in Channel 4 drama Ackley Bridge as Julie "Nana" Booth. Her character died in the fourth episode of the series. She later appeared in an episode of the third series of Ackley Bridge in 2019, as part of a scene with Missy Booth (Poppy Lee Friar).

Filmography

References

External links

Living people
1942 births
English film actresses 
English soap opera actresses